Montreal has been called the new hotbed for music worldwide by Rolling Stone magazine. The magazine also listed a song by the new indie rock group The Stills, "Still in Love", as one of the top songs of 2003. Originating in Montreal, the band Arcade Fire sold half a million copies of Funeral and were awarded a Grammy nomination for best alternative album.



A
A-Trak
Adam and the Amethysts
Adventure Club
The Agonist
AIDS Wolf
Alaclair Ensemble
All Systems Go!
April Wine
Arcade Fire
Asexuals
Audio Playground

B
The Barr Brothers
Backxwash
Beast
Beau Dommage
Bell Orchestre
The Bells
The Besnard Lakes
Beyond Creation
Bleu Jeans Bleu
Blinker the Star
The Box
Bran Van 3000
Les Breastfeeders
Burning The Oppressor
Busty and the Bass

C
Chromeo
Clues
Cœur de Pirate
Code Pie
Les Cowboys Fringants
Cryptopsy

D
The Damn Truth
Dead Obies
Dead Messenger
The Dears
Deja Voodoo
Desire
Despised Icon
Destroyalldreamers
Doughboys
Dubmatique
Duchess Says

E
Elephant Stone
Esmerine

F
First You Get the Sugar
Fleece
Fly Pan Am
Folly and the Hunter
Fontarabie
The Franklin Electric

G
Les Georges Leningrad
Godspeed You! Black Emperor
Grim Skunk
Grimes
The Gruesomes

H
Half Moon Run
Handsome Furs
Harmonium
Hellenica
Hexes and Ohs
The High Dials
Homeshake
Hot Springs

I
Islands

J
Jerry Jerry and the Sons of Rhythm Orchestra
Jean Leloup

K
Karkwa
Kataklysm
Kaytranada
The King Khan & BBQ Show

L
Lae
Lakes of Canada
Land of Talk
Lesbians on Ecstasy
Local Rabbits
The Lovely Feathers
Lunice
The Luyas

M
Mahogany Rush
Majical Cloudz
Malajube
Le Matos
Me Mom and Morgentaler
Men I Trust
Men Without Hats
Milk & Bone
Miracle Fortress
Misteur Valaire
Mobile
El Motor

N
Navet Confit
The New Cities
The Nils
No Joy
NOBRO
Nomadic Massive
Le Nouvel Ensemble Moderne
Numéro#

O
 Offenbach
 OK Cobra
 Ol' Savannah
 Ought

P
Parlovr
Patrick Watson
The Planet Smashers
Plants and Animals
Pony Up!
Priestess

Q
Quo Vadis

R
Rational Youth
Rhythm Activism
Ripcordz

S
The Sainte Catherines
The Sam Roberts Band
Set Fire to Flames
Shades of Culture
Simple Plan
Slaves on Dope
Les Sœurs Boulay
Stars
The Stills
Strange Froots
Les Stups
Sunset Rubdown
Suuns

T
Tchukon
Thee Silver Mt. Zion Memorial Orchestra & Tra-La-La Band
Then One Day
Think About Life
Three O'Clock Train
TOPS
Torngat
Trans-X
Tricky Woo

V
Voivod

W
We Are Wolves
Wolf Parade

Y
Yamantaka // Sonic Titan
Young Galaxy

See also
 Music of Quebec
 Music of Canada

Montreal

Musical groups